Kalat District is a district (bakhsh) in Abdanan County, Ilam Province, Iran. At the 2006 census, its population was 6,812, in 1,285 families.  The District has one city: Murmuri. The District has two rural districts (dehestan): Abanar Rural District and Murmuri Rural District.

References 

Districts of Ilam Province
Abdanan County